Robert O'Callaghan (10 July 1710 – January 1761) was an Irish politician.

He was educated at Trinity College, Dublin.
He represented Fethard, Tipperary in the Irish House of Commons between 1755 and 1760.

References

1710 births
1761 deaths
Irish MPs 1727–1760
Robert
Members of the Parliament of Ireland (pre-1801) for County Tipperary constituencies